Luke Masterson (born January 7, 1998) is an American football outside linebacker for the Las Vegas Raiders of the National Football League (NFL). He played college football at Wake Forest.

College career
Masterson was a member of the Wake Forest Demon Deacons for six seasons. Masterson made 85 tackles in his final season. At the end of his college career, he played in the 2022 Hula Bowl, and was named defensive MVP of his team.

Professional career

Masterson signed with the Las Vegas Raiders as an undrafted free agent on May 12, 2022. He made the Raiders' initial 53-man roster out of training camp.

References

External links
Wake Forest Demon Deacons bio
Las Vegas Raiders bio

Living people
Players of American football from Florida
American football linebackers
Wake Forest Demon Deacons football players
Las Vegas Raiders players
1998 births